A. M. Ariff  is an Indian politician and Member of Parliament representing Alappuzha constituency from 2019. A member of the Communist Party of India (Marxist), he represented Aroor constituency in Kerala Legislative Assembly from 2006 to 2019. Ariff made his first win from Aroor in 2006 defeating veteran political leader K. R. Gowri Amma.  A. M. Ariff has been elected 3 times from Aroor to Kerala Legislative in the years 2006, 2011 and 2016. Ariff was elected to Loksabha in 2019 from Alappuzha.

In a major electoral upset in the 2006 assembly elections, he defeated then-state Agriculture Minister and veteran politician K.R. Gouriamma. In the 2016 Kerala Legislative Assembly Elections, he was placed third in the list of candidates who secured the most votes. In 2017, he was awarded the Best MLA in India Award by Kashmir to Kerala Social Foundation. In 17th Lok Sabha he is the only LDF and CPI(M) MP from Kerala.

Political life 
Ariff began his active political life through student politics as a BSc degree student at Cherthala S.N. College where he was elected as College Union magazine editor and later, as chairman of the union. He subsequently held a series of positions in SFI  as Cherthala area president, Alappuzha district secretary and finally became a state committee member of the student wing of the party. He later became a state committee member of DYFI, the youth wing of CPI(M).

References

1964 births
Living people
Communist Party of India (Marxist) politicians from Kerala
Malayali politicians
Kerala politicians
People from Alappuzha district
Kerala MLAs 2006–2011
Kerala MLAs 2011–2016
Kerala MLAs 2016–2021
India MPs 2019–present